James "Jamie" McGahan (born 1959) is a Scottish cyclist.

Early life
Jamie McGahan is a native of Glasgow.

Career
McGahan won the Rás Tailteann in 1981, finished second in 1982 and third in 1983. Other wins include the Scottish Road Race Championships, Scottish Health Race and the Davie Bell Memorial.

He also represented Scotland at the 1982 Commonwealth Games in Brisbane in the road race and team time trial events.

Personal life

His niece, Imogen Cotter, participated in the Rás na mBan (women's race) in 2017.

References 

1959 births
Cyclists at the 1982 Commonwealth Games
Scottish male cyclists
Rás Tailteann winners
Cyclists from Glasgow
Living people
Commonwealth Games competitors for Scotland